Iker Losada Aragunde (born 1 August 2001) is a Spanish professional footballer who plays as a forward for Celta de Vigo B.

Club career
Losada was born in Catoira, Pontevedra, Galicia. A RC Celta de Vigo youth graduate, he made his senior debut with the reserves on 2 December 2018, coming on as a late substitute for Dani Vega in a 0–0 Segunda División B away draw against AD Unión Adarve.

Losada spent the 2019 pre-season with the first team, scoring a goal in a friendly match against 1. FC Union Berlin and becoming the first player of the 21st century to do so for the club. He made his professional – and La Liga – debut on 17 August; replacing fellow debutant Gabriel Fernández, he scored his team's only goal in a 1–3 home loss against Real Madrid.

Career statistics

Club

References

External links

2001 births
Living people
Spanish footballers
Footballers from Galicia (Spain)
People from Caldas (comarca)
Sportspeople from the Province of Pontevedra
Association football forwards
La Liga players
Primera Federación players
Segunda División B players
Celta de Vigo B players
RC Celta de Vigo players
Spain youth international footballers